Pimpinella peregrina is a species of biennial herb in the family Apiaceae. They have a self-supporting growth form and simple, broad leaves. Individuals can grow to 0.72 m.

Sources

References 

peregrina
Flora of Malta